The Coquihalla River (originally  or more recently and popularly ) is a tributary of the Fraser River in the Cascade Mountains of the Canadian province of British Columbia. It originates in the Coquihalla Lakes and empties into the Fraser River at Hope.

The Coquihalla River forms the northern boundary of two portions of the Cascades, the Skagit Range and the Hozameen Range.

Kw'ikw'iyá:la in the Halkomelem language of the Stó:lō, is a place name meaning "stingy container" or "stingy place". It refers specifically to a deep pool named Skw'éxweq or Skw'exwáq, near the mouth of what is now known as the Coquihalla River. The Stó:lō would go to this pool to spear suckerfish, which were plentiful there. According to Stó:lō oral history, the s'ó:lmexw (black-haired, 2-foot tall, dark-skinned underwater people) would grab the spears, preventing fish from being caught. Thus they were stingy with the fish. There were two other pools in the rivers where this was said to happen.

Portions of the motion picture First Blood were filmed there.

See also
 List of tributaries of the Fraser River

References

Canyons and gorges of British Columbia
Rivers of the Lower Mainland
Canadian Cascades
Tributaries of the Fraser River
Yale Division Yale Land District